Mohammed Abass (born 21 January 1995) is a Ghanaian professional footballer who plays for Techiman Eleven Wonders.

Career

Youth
Abass began his youth football at Red Bull Academy in Ghana. He later joined Tema Youth in July 2011 where he signed his first professional contract.

Medeama 
Mohammed started playing in the Ghana Premier League with Medeama in 2013.

He won the 2016 Ghana Super Cup and scored 5 goals during their 2016 CAF Confederation Cup campaign helping them qualify for the group stages of the competition for the first time in the club's history.

Asante Kotoko 
His performances with Medeama attracted attention from other club in Ghana and he was signed on a free transfer by Asante Kotoko in 2017. He played 13 league matches and scored 2 goals during the 2017 Ghana Premier League season. He was released by the club in April 2019, after an unimpressive showdown due to a long niggling knee injury.

Enyimba 
After being released by Asante Kotoko in April, Mohammed signed for Nigerian side Enyimba on July 23, 2019. He signed a two-year deal with the People's Elephant lads after successful negotiations and passing his medicals. He joined compatriots Farouk Mohammed and Fatau Dauda who were playing at the club.

Return to Medeama 
After serving one year of his two-year with Enyimba, Mohammed terminated his contract with the Aba-based club and rejoined former side Medeama on October 23, 2020, ahead of the 2020–21 Ghana Premier League season. On 24 January 2021, he scored a brace against International Allies to help Medeama to a 2–1 victory and maintain their home unbeaten run within that season.

Techiman Eleven Wonders 
On 21 October 2021, Abass was signed by Ghana Premier League club Techiman Eleven Wonders  in a definitive deal on a 2-year contract.

References

External links 

 
 
 

Living people
1995 births
Association football forwards
Ghanaian footballers
Medeama SC players
Asante Kotoko S.C. players
Ghana Premier League players
Enyimba F.C. players
Expatriate footballers in Nigeria
Ghanaian expatriate footballers
Ghanaian expatriate sportspeople in Nigeria
Nigeria Professional Football League players
Techiman Eleven Wonders FC players